Carlat is a commune in the Cantal department in south-central France.

The "Rocher de Carlat" or rock of Carlat situated above the picturesque commune was once the site of one of the most powerful and impenetrable chateaux in all of France. It was the seat of Jacques d'Armagnac, Duke of Nemours and often the center of intrigue, resistance and rebellion against the kings of France. Completely razed by order of the king in 1604 to alleviate the inconvenience of rebellious and ambitious southern relatives, hardly a trace of the chateau remains. The site is now a park, open to visitors and commanding sweeping views of the Carlades.

The chateau appears in history as early as the year 839. The presence of Queen Margot, Marguerite de Valois, who sought refuge at Carlat from 30 September 1585 to 15 October 1586, lives on in local lore.  Given the site's historic importance as a major fortress of Auvergne, a substantial archeological program is underway to rediscover its treasures.

Population

See also
Communes of the Cantal department

References

External links
Official site
Chateau archeology

Communes of Cantal